= Town Estate of Popov — Elagin =

Town Estate of Popov – Elagin
- Городская усадьба Попова – Елагина
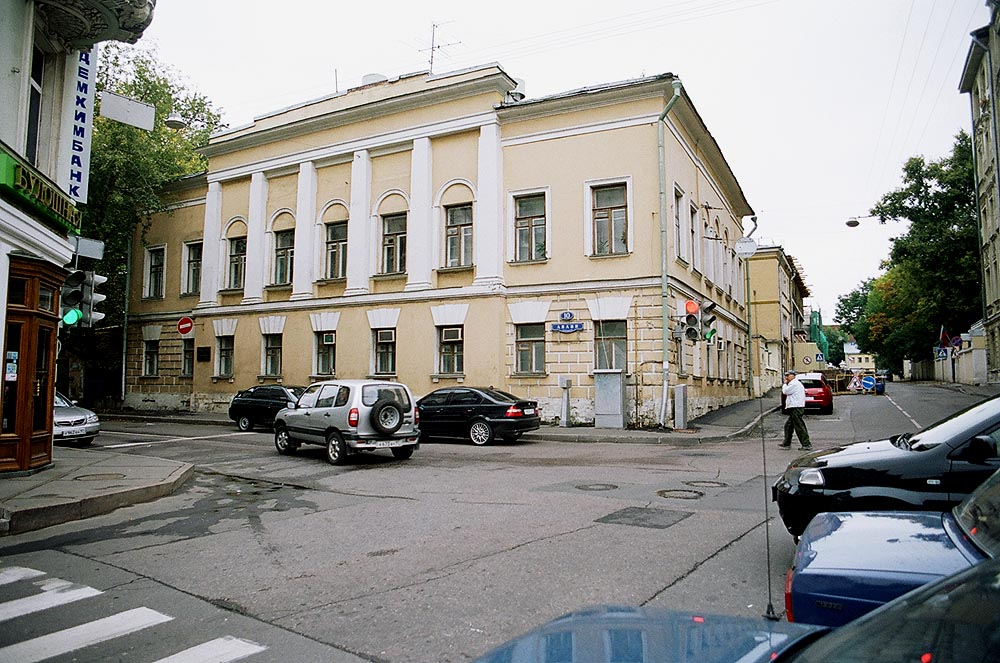
- Interactive map of Town Estate of Popov – Elagin
- Location: Moscow, Lyalin lane, 10/14
- Coordinates: 55°45′34″N 37°39′06″E
- Beginning date: 1833
- Completion date: 1838

The Town Estate of Popov – Elagin (Russian: Городская усадьба Попова – Елагина) is a building in the center of Moscow (Lyalin lane, 10/14). Built in the 1830s in the late Empire style. The city manor has the status of an object of cultural heritage of federal significance.

== History ==
In 1833 the Moscow merchant S. G. Popov filed an application to the Commission on the structure of Moscow for the construction of a mansion on the corner of Lyalina Square. Presumably, the construction was completed in 1838. During the Soviet era, the former mansion housed communal apartments. At that time, the mansion lost some of the stucco decoration.

In the post-Soviet period, the building housed various offices. In 2016, the mansion was put up for auction. Under the terms of the contract, the new owner will have to carry out engineering and technical, restoration and repair work, to adapt the building to modern use.

== Architecture ==
A two-story late-imperial mansion is located on the corner of Lyalin and Barashevsky lanes. The main facade, overlooking Lyalin Lane, is marked with a six-columned portico. The facade is completed by an attic, which has a characteristic form for the 1830s–1840s.

In the central part of the facade, overlooking the Barashevsky lane, slightly protruding rizalit. Three central windows of the second floor are framed by semi-circular niches. On the side is an empty fence with a gate through which you can get into the yard.

The estate complex also includes a three-story brick house (Barashevsky Pereulok, 12), built in the second half of the 19th century. There were services.
